Alonso de León "El Mozo"  (c. 1639–1691) was an explorer and governor in New Spain who led several expeditions into the area that is now northeastern Mexico and southern Texas.

Early life
Alonso de León González was born in 1639, in the settlement of Cadereyta, Nuevo León in New Spain. He was the third son of General Alonso De León, a celebrated chronicler,  historian and conquistador of the frontier of Nuevo León, and Josefa González. To distinguish him from his father, who was also a prominent leader in the colony, sometimes the phrase, El Mozo, would later be appended to his name (or its English equivalent, "the younger").

De León trained in Spain for a naval career and joined the Spanish navy in 1657. By 1660 he had returned to Nuevo León. He was frequently appointed to lead exploratory parties, and he became an entrepreneur, most notably in salt mining. De León married Agustina Cantú and had six children with her.

Expeditions
In 1684, French explorer La Salle led an ill-fated expedition which was intended to establish a colony at the mouth of the Mississippi River. Instead, the colonists ended up on the Texas coast, where La Salle established a settlement. When Spanish leaders received word that the French had founded a settlement in the northern portion of their territory, De León was chosen to lead the effort to locate and expel the French colonists.

The first two expeditions, in 1686 and 1687, yielded no evidence of the French colony. One Frenchman, Jean Gery, was captured during the third expedition in 1688. It was during De León's fourth expedition, in 1689, that he finally discovered La Salle's settlement, which had been abandoned by that time.

Political offices and later life
De León served as mayor of Cadereyta from 1667 to 1675. He was governor of Nuevo León from 1682 to 1684. In 1687, he was appointed governor of the region of Coahuila.

He was involved in establishing San Francisco de los Tejas in 1690, the first Spanish mission in East Texas. In doing so, he blazed the trail for much of the Old San Antonio Road. During his expeditions, he named several Texas rivers, including the San Marcos River, the Guadalupe, the Medina, the Nueces, and the Trinity.

De León died in Coahuila on March 20, 1691.

Notes

References

Further reading
Clemente Rendón de la Garza, "Vidas Ilustres (English Version): General Alonso de Leon 'El Mozo'".
Handbook of Texas Online, s.v. "De León, Alonso".
Mary G. Ramos (ed.), Texas Almanac 2002-2003, Texas A&M University Press, 2001; pp. 30, 65, 66. .

Spanish explorers of North America
Governors of Nuevo León
Governors of Coahuila
1639 births
1691 deaths
Year of birth uncertain
People of Spanish Texas
People from Cadereyta, Nuevo León
People from Montemorelos, Nuevo León
1680s in Mexico
1680s in Texas
17th-century Spanish people